Tamil Nadu Dr. J. Jayalalithaa Music and Fine Arts University (TNJMFAU), formerly and commonly known as Tamil Nadu Music and Fine Arts University (TNMFAU), is a government music and fine arts university situated in Adyar in the southern part of the city of Chennai, Tamil Nadu, India. It is one of the premier music and fine arts universities named after the former chief minister of Tamil Nadu J. Jayalalithaa.

History

The members of the High Level Committee of music and arts submitted the proposals to the former Chief Minister of Tamil Nadu J. Jayalalithaa in the presence of N. R. Sivapathi, former Minister for Art and Culture Department of Tamil Nadu in 2012 to start a separate music and arts university in Tamil Nadu.

The Tamil Nadu Music and Fine Arts University Act, 2013 received the assent of the former President of India Pranab Mukherjee in 2013. The university was established on 14 November 2013, exclusively for Music and Fine Arts so as to preserve, foster, popularize and propagate the traditional performing arts, such as Indian Music, Bharatanatyam, Fine Arts and Sculpture. This affiliating University started functioning from July 2014 and is governed by the said Act. By 2019, It was named after the former chief minister of Tamil Nadu J. Jayalalithaa through The Tamil Nadu Dr. J. Jayalalithaa Music and Fine Arts University, Chennai Act, 2019 by the former chief minister of Tamil Nadu Edappadi K. Palaniswami.

The Tamil Nadu Dr. J. Jayalalithaa Music and Fine Arts University is the only Music and Fine Arts University in Tamil Nadu capable of granting affiliation to new music and arts colleges,  government or self - financing; and awarding degrees (also note that until 1988, all degrees of music and arts in Tamil Nadu were awarded by the University of Madras).

Administration
The Chancellor and Pro-chancellor of the university are the Chief Minister and the Minister for Art and Culture Department of Tamil Nadu respectively. The Vice-Chancellor is the main academic officer and administrator in its everyday functioning of the university who is appointed by the Government of Tamil Nadu.

References

External links
 

Music schools in India
Art schools in India
Dance schools in India
Universities in Chennai
2013 establishments in Tamil Nadu
Educational institutions established in 2013
Bharatanatyam dance schools